Carolyn Sargent is a medical anthropologist.

She focuses on gender studies and health issues, with interests in reproductive health, managing the health of women in low-income families, and decision making in the medical field. She has done fieldwork in West Africa, Benin, Jamaica and France where she worked on reproductive health, midwifery, prenatal care and migrant fertility patterns.

She is professor of sociocultural anthropology and women, gender, and sexuality studies at Washington University in St. Louis. Sargent was the director of women's studies at Southern Methodist University for an extended period. Sargent served as president of the Society for Medical Anthropology.

Sargent is a fan of the French medical insurance system. She has called upon anthropologists to learn about and become involved with national health care issues. In an issue of the Medical Anthropology Quarterly, Sargent asked that anthropologists help to, "shape public discourses and policy in ways we have rarely done before." She served as a community representative to two hospital ethics committees while she lived in Dallas, Texas.

Education 

In 1968, Sargent graduated from Michigan State University with High Honors and a Bachelor of Arts. She majored in Japanese, French and international studies and was a member of Phi Beta Kappa. However, in her senior year of college took anthropology classes, and a professor suggested that she earn a graduate degree in anthropology. Sargent received a Marshall Scholarship, which finances up to forty young Americans annually to study at the University of Manchester. In 1970, she received her M.A. for social anthropology.

As she was finishing at Manchester, she decided to visit her boyfriend in the Peace Corps in West Africa. She found that they were looking for a researcher and joined the project. She was part of an animal traction project that was training draft animals. Ten men worked on training oxen, while she worked on researching what kind of people invested in the oxen, what types of supplies they required and how much it would cost. In her free time, she went to a local maternity clinic, which fed her interest in maternal and child health.

After three years in the Peace Corps, she returned to the U.S to work on her Ph.D. Her experiences with the maternity clinics in the Peace Corps inspired her dissertation and she returned to West Africa to work on it. In 1979, she received her Ph.D. in anthropology at Michigan State University.

Career 

From 1980 to 1985 Sargent was an assistant professor at Southern Methodist University (SMU). She became an associate professor in 1985 and in 1990 became a representative for the Texas Committee on Health Objectives for the 90's sponsored by the Department of Public Health. She became a full professor at SMU in 1992 and director of the Women's Studies Program at SMU in 1994. In 2008 she became a professor at Washington University in St. Louis, in the department of anthropology's Women, Gender, Sexuality Studies Program. She was the president of the Society of Medical Anthropology (SMA) until December 2009.

Working with the SMA Task Force, she and other anthropologists look at what anthropologists can do to participate in policy creation. Sargent created the Task Force because she felt that medical anthropologists could give good information and perspective in regard to the national health care debate, seeing that almost all of them had done research of some sort on the subject. They were looking at how infrastructure could help their research become available to policy makers. Most information is available in the form of (unread) articles and books. Sargent had the idea that the Medical Anthropology Student Association and Medical Anthropology Graduate Association could compile annotated digests and shorter versions of articles and books for policy-makers. She is developing the concept of "research on demand." This would involve offering anthropologist research efforts to legislators who were planning on making a policy change.

Honors 

 2003: Enduring Edited Collection Book Prize, Council on Anthropology and Reproduction, SMA (for Childbirth and Authoritative Knowledge, with Robbie Davis-Floyd)
 2005: Ford Senior Research Award, SMU ($15,000)
 2006: Rockefeller Foundation Bellagio Grant, Wenner-Gren Foundation for Anthropological Research Grant, for International Conference on "Reproduction, Globalization and the State," 1–7 June (Airfare for 18 international participants provided by Wenner-Gren; One week conference lodging and logistical support hosted by Rockefeller at the Bellagio Estate, Italy)

Research 

During her time in the Peace Corps, Sargent worked in a maternity clinic that primarily catered to elite women. Sargent began collecting data on baby weights despite disapproval from the midwives working in the clinic. Along with observations compiled over her three-year service this became the focus of her graduate research on reproductive health.

Over the years, Sargent's interests expanded to include medical ethics, immigrant health and the controversial debate regarding the healthcare system in the US For ten years, she conducted extensive research in France. Many of her observations stem from her experiences as a patient. Consequently, she supports a "single-payer" healthcare system for the United States. Sargent conducted contrasting research in Dallas, where she sat on two hospital ethics committees for over a decade and was involved in research projects spanning from community to clinical settings.

Visiting research appointments 

 2005: Associated researcher, IRIS, (Interdisciplinary Research Institute, University of Paris 13, Ecole des Hautes Etudes en Sciences Sociales, INSERM, director Didier Fassin)
 2000–2005: Research fellow, University of Paris V, Center for the Study of African and Asian Populations (2002 renamed Inter-Population Center)
 1999–2000: Research fellow, INED (National Institute for the Study of Demography), Paris, France
 1998: Research fellow, CEPED (Center for the Study of Population and Development), Paris, France
 1987: Research fellow, Institute of Social and Economic Research, University of the West Indies, Jamaica

Research grants 

 2000–2006: "Reproduction and Representations of Family among Malians Migrants in Paris, France" (National Science Foundation, $130,000, Sargent PI) (additionally two REG graduate student supplements)
 1998–2000: "Reproduction and Representations of Family among Malian Migrants in France" (Wenner-Gren Foundation, $30,000, Sargent PI)
 1988: "Factors Influencing Prenatal Care Among Low-Income Jamaican Women" with Joan Rawlins, University of The West Indies; (International Center for Research on Women, and United States Agency for International Development, Sargent PI)
 1987–1989: "Parental Strategies for Child Health in Jamaica" (National Science Foundation, $43,000, $15,000, Sargent PI)
 1982–1983: "Obstetrical Care Practices in People's Republic of Benin" (National Science Foundation, $20,000, Sargent PI)

Additional experience 

 2003—Community Representative, Parkland Memorial Hospital Ethics Committee
 1999—Community Representative, Baylor Institutional Ethics Committee

Personal life 

She is a mother of two daughters.

Publications

Monographs 
 1989: *Maternity, Medicine and Power: Reproductive Decisions in Urban Benin. Berkeley: University of California Press.
 1982: *The Cultural Context for Therapeutic Choice: Obstetrical Care Decisions in a Bariba Community. Dordrecht, Holland: D. Reidel Publishing Company, Inc. Edited Volumes.

Edited volumes 
 2010: *(with Carole Browner) Reproduction, Globalization, and the State. Duke University Press. 
 2009: *(with Caroline Brettell) Gender in Cross-Cultural Perspective, Fifth Edition, Revised. Englewood Cliffs, New Jersey: Prentice-Hall. 
 1998: *(with Nancy Scheper-Hughes) Small Wars: The Cultural Politics of Childhood. Berkeley: University of California Press. 
 1997: *(with Robbie Davis-Floyd) Childbirth and Authoritative Knowledge. Berkeley: University of California Press. 
 1997: *(with Caroline Brettell) Gender in Cross-Cultural Perspective, Second Edition, Revised. Englewood Cliffs, New Jersey: Prentice-Hall. 
 1996: *(with Caroline Brettell) Gender and Health. Englewood Cliffs, New Jersey: Prentice-Hall. 
 1996: *(with Thomas Johnson) Medical Anthropology: A Handbook of Theory and Method. Second Ed., Revised. Westport, Connecticut: Greenwood/Praeger. 
 1993: *(with Caroline Brettell) Gender in Cross-Cultural Perspective. Englewood Cliffs, New Jersey: Prentice-Hall. 
 1990: *(with Thomas Johnson) Medical Anthropology: A Handbook of Theory and Method. Westport, Connecticut: Greenwood Press (Praeger, paperback).

Edited journal issues 
 2006: *(with Caroline Brettell, guest editors) Migration, Identity, and Citizenship: Anthropological Perspectives. American Behavioral Scientist 50(1). 5
 2006: *(C. Sargent, guest editor) Medical Anthropology in the Muslim World. Medical Anthropology Quarterly Special Issue 20(2)..
 1996: *(with Robbie Davis-Floyd, guest editors) The Social Production of Authoritative Knowledge in Childbirth. Medical Anthropology Quarterly Special Issue, June.
 1992: *(with Linda Whiteford) Historical Antecedents of Contemporary Medical Systems in The Caribbean. Social Science and Medicine Special Issue 35(10).
 Articles
 2009: The Construction of “Cultural Difference” and Its Therapeutic Significance in Immigrant Mental Health Services in France. Culture, Medicine, Psychiatry 33:2–20 (with Stephanie Larchanche).
 2007: *(with Stephanie Larchanche) The Muslim Body and the Politics of Immigration in France: Popular and Biomedical Representations of Malian Migrant Women. Body and Society, Sage Press. Special Issue 13(3), Islam and the Body.
 2007: *When the Personal is Political: Contested Reproductive Strategies among West African Migrants in France. In Reproductive disruptions: Gender, Technology, and Biopolitics in the New Millennium. Marcia Inhorn, ed. pp. 165–183. Berghahn Books.
 2006: *Liminal Lives: Immigration Status, Gener, and the Construction of Identities among Malian Migrants in Paris. American Behavioral Scientist. 50(1):9–27 (with Stephanie Larchanche-Kim).
 2006: *Reproductive Strategies and Islamic Discourse: Malian Migrants Negotiate Everyday Life in Paris, France. In Medical Anthropology in the Muslim World. Medical Anthropology Quarterly Special Issue 20(1): 31–50.
 2006: *(with Carolyn Smith-Morris) Questioning Our Principles: Anthropological Contributions to Ethical Dilemmas in Clinical Practice. Cambridge Quarterly of Healthcare Ethics 15(2), Spring.
 2006: *Lamenting the Winter of French Fertility. Curare 29 (1), Special Issue. Viola Hoerbst and Sylvie Schuster eds.
 2005: *(with Stephanie Larchanche and Samba Yatera) The Evolution of Telecommunications in the Context of Transnational Migration. Paris: Hommes et Migrations 1256:131–140.
 2005: *Counseling Contraception for Malian Migrants in Paris: Global, State, and Personal Politics. Human Organization 64(2):147–156.
 2003: Gender, Body, Meaning: Anthropological Perspectives on Self-Injury and Borderline Personality. Philosophy, Psychiatry, & Psychology 10(1): 25–29.
 2003: Birth. In Carol and Melvin Ember, eds. Encyclopedia of Medical Anthropology. Plenum.
 2002: *Polygamy, Disrupted Reproduction and the State: The Case of Malian Migrants in France. Social Science and Medicine 56(2003):1961–1972.
 2002: *Patient and Physician Explanatory Models for Acute Bronchitis. Journal of Family Practice 51(12):1035–1040.
 1992: *(with Michael Harris) Gender Ideology, Child Care, and Child Health in Jamaica. American Ethnologist 19(3):523–537.
 1992: (with Joan Rawlins) Transformations in Maternity Care in Jamaica. Social Science and Medicine 35(10):1225–1233.
 1992: Gender, Reproduction, and Health Care: Comparative Perspectives. Reviews in Anthropology 263–273.
 1991: *Factors Influencing Prenatal Care among Low-Income Jamaican Women. Human Organization 50(2):179–188.
 1990: (with Joan Rawlins) Factors Influencing Prenatal Care Use among Low-Income Jamaican Women. Research Report Number 14. Washington, D.C.: ICRW.
 1989: *(with Nancy Stark) Childbirth Education and Childbirth Models: Parental Perspectives on Control, Anesthesia, and Technological Intervention in The Birth Process. Medical Anthropology Quarterly 3:1(NS):36-51.
 1988: *Witchcraft and Infanticide in Bariba Culture. Ethnology 27(1):79–95.
 1987: *(with Nancy Stark) Surgical Birth: Interpretations of Cesarean Delivery among Private Hospital Patients and Nursing Staff. Social Science and Medicine 25(12):1269–76.
 1986: *(with David Freidel) From Clay to Metal: Culture Change and Container Usage among the Bariba of Northern Benin, West Africa. African Archaeological Review, 177–195.
 1986: *(with Ronald Wetherington and Carol McKinney) Socioeconomic Status and the Incidence of Low Birthweight among the Bariba of Benin. East African Medical Journal: 91–98.
 1985: (with Thomas Johnson and Margot Wilson) Contraceptive Decision-Making. Advances in Contraceptive Delivery Systems. Monograph 1:158–170.
 1984: *Between Death and Shame. Dimensions of Pain in Bariba Culture. Special Issue, Social Science and Medicine 19(12):1299–1304.
 1984: *(with John Marcucci) Aspects of Khmer Medicine Among Refugees in Dallas. Medical Anthropology Quarterly 16:1, pp. 7–9.
 1984: *Obstetrical Choice Among Urban Women in Benin. Social Science and Medicine 20(3):287–292.

Book chapters 
 2009: Situating Childbirth in the Anthropology of Reproduction (with Lauren Gulbas). In Companion to Medical Anthropology, Pamela Erickson and Merrill Singer, eds. Blackwell.
 2005: *(with Carole Browner) Donner un Genre a l’Anthropologie Medicale (Engendering Medical Anthropology). In Anthropologie de la Sante et de la Maladie: Perspectives Internationales et Enjeux Contemporains/Anthropology of Health and Illness. International Perspectives and Current Debates. Francine Saillant and Serge Genest, eds. Quebec: Presses Universite Laval; Paris: Anthropos/Economica. English edition forthcoming, Blackwell.
 2005: (with Dennis Cordell) Islam, Identity and Gender in Daily Life among Malians in France. In L’Islam Politique au Sud du Sahara. Identites, Discours et Enjeux. Muriel Gomez-Perez, ed,. pp. 177–209. Paris: Karthala.
 1998: *Bad Boys and Good Girls: Gender and Child Health in Jamaica. In Nancy Scheper-Hughes and Carolyn Sargent, eds. Small Wars: The Cultural Politics of Childhood. pp. 202–228. Berkeley: University of California Press.
 1998: *(with Ruth Wilson, Constance Binde, and Kouame Kale) Prospects for Family Planning in Côte d'Ivoire: Ethnographic Contributions to the Development of Culturally Appropriate Population Policy. In Robert Hahn, Ed. Anthropology in Public and International Health, Oxford University press. 
 1997: *(with Grace Bascope) Ways of Knowing about Birth in Three Cultures. In Robbie David-Floyd and Carolyn Sargent (eds.) Childbirth and Authoritative Knowledge. pp. 183–209. Berkeley: University of California Press.
 1996: (with Caroline Brettell) Introduction. In Carolyn Sargent and Caroline Brettell (eds.) Gender and Health. pp. 1–29. Englewood Cliff, New Jersey: Prentice Hall.
 1990: *Pain and the Management of Reproduction. In Penn Handwerker (ed.) The Politics of Reproduction, pp. 69–81. Boulder: Westview Press.
 1990 [1996]: *(with Carole Browner) Anthropology and Reproduction. In Thomas Johnson and Carolyn Sargent (eds.) Medical Anthropology: A Handbook of Theory and Method, pp. 215–230. Westport, Connecticut: Greenwood Press.
 1989: *Women's Roles and Women Healers. In Carol McClain (ed.) Women Healers. New Jersey: Rutgers Press.
 1988: *(with John Marcucci) Khmer Prenatal Health Practices and The American Clinical Experience. In Karen Michaelson (ed.), The Culture of Childbirth. New York: Bergin and Garvey Publishing Co.
 1986: *Prospects for the Professionalization of Indigenous Midwifery. In The Professionalization of African Medicine. M. Last and G. Chavunduka, eds. London: Manchester University Press for the International African Institute, pp. 137–149.
 1985: Witches, Merchants and Midwives: Domains of Power Among Bariba Women. In African Healing Strategies. Brian du Toit and Ismail H. Abdalla, eds. Buffalo: Trado-Medic Books, pp. 96–107.
 1981: Solitary Confinement: Birth Practices Among the Bariba of Benin. In An Anthropology of Human Birth. Margarita Kay, ed. Philadelphia: F. A. Davis Company.

Papers presented 
 2009: Millennial Medical Anthropology. SMA 50th Anniversary Meeting. New Haven, Yale University.
 2009: Cutting (with Rebecca Lester). In Salve or Sore: The Social Management of Socially-Sanctioned Trauma. Organized Session, SMA 50th Anniversary Meeting. New Haven, Yale University.
 2008: Co-Chair & Organizer with Tanya Luhrmann, Integrating Local and Western Psychotherapies: Prospects for Disciplinary and Clinical Collaborations. Invited Session, Society for Medical Anthropology and Society for Psychological Anthropology, AAA, San Francisco.
 2008: “Cultural Difference” and Models of Mental Health Care for Migrant Populations in France (with Stephanie Larchanche). Integrating Local and Western Psychotherapies: Prospects for Disciplinary and Clinical Collaborations. Invited Session, Society for Medical Anthropology and Society for Psychological Anthropology, AAA, San Francisco.
 2008: Meternite, Liberte, Egalite: les Violences, la Sante et les Enjeux Reproductifs chez les Femmes Migrantes Musulmanes et Africaines des Banlieues de Paris. Seminaire de Recherche, Universite Bordeaux 2, France.
 2008: L’Anthropologie Medicale Clinique. Presentation, University of Paris V Diplome Universitaire, Psychiatrie.
 2006: The Politics of Immigration and the Production of Reproductive Health. Paper Presented at Double Plenary Session, Joint SfAA-SMA meeting, Vancouver.
 2006: Maternite, Liberte, Egalite: Burning Cars and Health Costs in the Immigrant Suburbs of Paris. Paper Presented at AAA Presidential Session, Embodied Danger: The Health Costs of War and Political Violence. AAA Annual Meeting, San Jose.
 2005: The Muslim African Body and the Politics of Immigration In France. Paper Presented at Invited SMA Session, AAA Annual Meeting, Washington, D.C. (with Stephanie Larchanche-Kim).
 2005: Discordant Discourses. Paper Presented at Session “Beyond the Doctor-Patient Dyad.” AAA Annual Meeting, Washington, D.C. (with Stephanie Larchanche-Kim.)
 2005: Contested Discourses, Assertive Practices. Paper Presented for Invited Joint Session of African Studies Association/Middle East Studies Association, on “Disrupted Reproduction,” Washington, D.C.
 2005: When the Personal is Political: Contested Reproductive Strategies among Malians in France. Plenary Speaker, University of Michigan conference on “Disrupted Reproduction,” Marcia Inhorn, Organizer.
 2004: Papers for Invited Session on Islam and the Body (chair, Diane Tober), and for the Session Beyond the Patient Dyad (co-chairs, Cameron Hay and Carole Browner), postponed in response to American Anthropological Association meeting disruption.
 2004: (with Dennis Cordell) The Second Diaspora: African Immigrants in France and the Global Economy. Paper Presented at the African Studies Association meetings, New Orleans, 11–14 November.
 2004: *co-chair, with Marcia Inhorn) Medical Anthropology in the Muslim World: Ethnographic Reflections. Society for Applied Anthropology/Society for Medical Anthropology joint meetings, Dallas Texas, 1 April.
 2004: Negotiating Islam in Everyday Practices of Marriage and Reproduction. Paper Presented for the session Medical Anthropology in the Muslim World. Society for Applied Anthropology/Society for Medical Anthropology joint meetings, Dallas, Texas, 1 April.
 2003: Polygamie, l’Etat et le Bouleversement des Modes de Reproduction. Presented at the Ecole des Hautes Etudes, Paris, 4 June.
 2002: Counseling Contraception: Cultural Stereotypes and Clinical Communication with Malian Women in Paris. Paper presented at a session (Culture as Context for Clinical Communication) at the 101st Annual Meeting of the American Anthropological Association.
 2002: (with Dennis Cordell and Samba Yatera) New Information and Communication Technologies, Expanding Community, and Transnational Arguments about Sex, Family and Religion Between Malian Migrants in France and their Villages of Origin. Africal Studies Association.
 2002: (with Dennis Cordell, Samba Yatera, Ismael Maiga) Family, Gender and Health among Malian Migrants in Paris. Session organised by Cordell and Sargent on Family, Politics and Integration among Migrants in Paris, for European Social Science History Conference, The Hague, Netherlands.
 2001: (with Robbie Davis-Floyd) Science and Humanism in Midwifery and Anthropology. Organizer, co-chair and discussant, Session presented at the 100th Annual Meeting of the American Anthropological Association.
 2000: (with Dennis Cordell) Immigration, Islam, and Family Formation among Malian Migrants in France. Third European Social Science History Conference. Amsterdam.
 2000: Reproduction, Immigration and the State: The case of Malian Migrants in France. Paper presented at a Session (Stratified Reproduction: Reproductive Strategies: The Intersection of State Policies and Local/Global Formations in Women's Reproductive Choices) at the 99th Annual Meeting of the American Anthropology Association.
 2000: Feminist Critiques of Science and Medical Anthropology. Commentary presented at an Invited Session (Feminist Critiques of Anthropological Practice: Reflections on Recent Trends) of the 99th Annual Meeting, American Anthropology Association.
 2000: (with Dennis Cordell and Samba Yatera) Immigration Policy, Family, and Reproductive Strategies among Malian Migrants in France. Paper presented at the Annual Meeting of the Canadian African Studies Association, Edmonton, Alberta.
 1999: Reproduction and Anthropology: Trends and Trajectories. Paper presented at the 98th Annual Meeting of the American Anthropological Association, at a Council on Anthropology and Reproduction Session (The Anthropology of Reproduction).
 1999: (with Dennis Cordell) Immigration Policy, Islam, and Reproductive Strategies Among Malian Migrants in France. Paper presented at a session (Temporal Horizons in Social Reproduction) of the 98th Annual Meeting of the American Anthropological Association.
 1998: Co-chair and co-organizer, (with Carole Browner) of Invited Session (The Gendered Politics of Reproduction). 97th Annual Meeting of the American Anthropological Association.
 1998: (with Dinnes Cordell and Samba Yatera) Representations of Family among Malian Immigrants to France. Paper presented at an Invited Session (Gendered Politics of Reproduction) of the 97th Annual Meeting of the American Anthropological Association.
 1997: Co-chair and co-organizer, (with Soheir Morsy) of Invited Session (Society for Medical Anthropology) on Reconstructing the Paren Discipline's Foundation: Medical ANthropological Contributions in Honor of Arthur Rubel. 96th Annual Meeting of the American Anthropological Association.
 1997: (with Joci Ryan) Gender, Virility and Reproductive Health in Urban Jamaica. Paper presented at an Invited Session (Reconstructing the Parent Discipline...in Honor of Arthur Rubel) of the 96th Annual Meeting of the American Anthropological Association.
 1994: Anthropological Contributions to National Health Policy. Roundtable, 41st Annual Meeting of the American Anthropological Association.
 1994: Anthropological Collaborations with Public Health. Joint Workshop of the AAA and the Centers for Disease Control. 41st Annual Meeting of the American Anthropological Association.
 1993: Reproductive Health Policy in Jamaica and the United States: Prospects for the Demedicalization of Birth. Paper presented at an Invited Session of the 40th Annual Meeting of the American Anthropological Association.
 1993: Reproductive Health Policy in Jamaica and the United States:: Prospects for the Demedicalization of Birth. Paper presented  at an Invited Session of the 40th Annual Meeting of the American Anthropological Association.
 1992: Ways of Knowing about Birth in Three Cultures. Paper presented at an Invited Session (Papers in Honor of Brigitte Jordan) of the 39th Annual Meeting of the American Anthropological Association.
 1991: Policy Issues in the Use of Public Prenatal Care Services in Jamaica. National Council for International Health, Washington, D.C.
 1991: Gender Ideology, Childrearing and Child Health in Jamaica. Paper presented at an Invited Session of the 88th Annual Meeting of the American ANthropological Association.
 1991: Co-chair and co-organizer (with Nancy Scheper-Hughes), Invited Session (Mothers and Children at Risk: Maternal and Child Survival). 88th Annual Meeting of the American Anthropological Association.
 1990: (with Joan Rawlins) Prenatal Care Decisions among Jamaican Women. Paper presented at International Center for Research on Women Final Conference, Washington, D.C.
 1988: Organizer (with Linda Whiteford) of panel on Caribbean Transformations: Contemporary Health Care Systems and their Historical Antecedents, sponsored by the Society for Medical Anthropology and the Society for Latin American Anthropology. 87th Annual Meeting of the American Anthropological Association.
 1988: (with Joan Rawlins) Transformations in Maternity Services in Jamaica. Paper presented at the 87th Annual Meeting of the American Anthropological Association.
 1987: Pain and the Management of Reproduction. 86th Annual Meeting of The American Anthropological Association, Chicago. Organized Session, Council for Anthropology and Reproduction.
 1987: Moderator, Medical Anthropology Roundtable on Gender and Differential Health Care through the Life Cycle. 86th Annual Meeting of the American Anthropological Association.
 1986: Moderator, Medical Anthropology Roundtable on The Political Economy of Women's Health. 85th Annual Meeting of The American Anthropological Association.
 1986: Organizer (with Carole Browner) of session of Knowledge and Power in the Management of Reproduction. Joint meeting of the American Ethnological Association and Society for Medical Anthropology. Wrightsville Beach, North Carolina.
 1986: (with Nancy Stark) Childbirth or Surgery: the Implications of Lay and Specialist Perceptions for the Management of Cesarean Delivery. Paper presented at joint meeting of the American Anthropological Association and Society for Medical Anthropology. Wrightsville Beach, North Carolina.
 1986: (with Nancy Stark) The Cesarean Experience: Women's Responses to Technological Intervention in Childbirth. 85th Annual Meeting of the American Anthropological Association.
 1985: Chair, Volunteered Session, Traditional Medicine in a Modern World at the 84th Annual Meeting of the American Anthropological Association, Washington, D.C.
 1984: Witches, Merchants and Midwives: Domains of Power Among Urban Bariba Women. Paper presented at a conference on African Healing Strategies, University of Florida, Gainesville.
 1984: Born to Die: The Fate of Extraordinary Children in Bariba Culture. Paper presented at an Invited Session (Child Survival) of the 83rd Annual Meeting of the American Anthropological Association.
 1983: Obstetrical care among Urban Women in Benin. Paper presented at the 82nd Annual Meeting of the American Anthropological Association.
 1983: Organizer (with Carole Browner) of session on Reproduction and the Cultural Construction of Gender. Sponsored by the Society for Medical Anthropology, 82nd Annual Meeting of the American Anthropological Association.
 1982: Cosmology and Medical Choice among the Bariba. Paper presented at Dumbarton Oaks Seminar, Washington, D.C.
 1981: The Implications of Discrepant Models of Clinical Reality for Obstetrical Care Choices: The Bariba of Benin. Paper presented at 1981 Meeting of the Society for Applied Anthropology, Edinburgh, Scotland.

References 

C Sargent. (2010). 
C Sargent. (7 January 2010). 
Dominguez, V. (Interviewer). Sargent, C. (Interviewee). (2010). Inside the President's Studio [Interview Transcript] 
Feldman, P. Department of Anthropology: 
Schmid, O. and Simpson, J. (5 August 2009). 
Sargent, C. (2008). Department of Anthropology: Carolyn Sargent. 
Sargent, C. (2010). Curriculum vitae
Sargent, C. (2009). 
Washington University in St. Louis. (2012). 

Living people
Alumni of the University of Manchester
British anthropologists
British women scientists
Medical anthropologists
Michigan State University alumni
Peace Corps volunteers
Southern Methodist University faculty
Washington University in St. Louis faculty
Year of birth missing (living people)
British women anthropologists